The Treaty of Nystad was the last peace treaty of the Great Northern War of 1700–1721. Sweden had settled with the other parties in Stockholm (1719 and 1720) and in Frederiksborg (1720).

During the war Peter I of Russia had occupied all Swedish possessions on the eastern Baltic coast: Swedish Ingria (where he began to build the soon-to-be new Russian capital of St. Petersburg in 1703), Swedish Estonia and Swedish Livonia (which had capitulated in 1710), and Finland.

In Nystad, King Frederick I of Sweden formally recognized the transfer of Estonia, Livonia, Ingria, and Southeast Finland (Kexholmslän and part of Karelian Isthmus) to Russia in exchange for two million silver thaler, while Russia returned the bulk of Finland to Swedish rule.

The Treaty enshrined the rights of the German Baltic nobility within Estonia and Livonia to maintain their financial system, their existing customs border, their self-government, their Lutheran religion, and the German language; this special position in the Russian Empire was reconfirmed by all Russian Tsars from Peter the Great (reigned 1682-1725) to Alexander II (reigned 1855-1881).

Nystad manifested the decisive shift in the European balance of power which the war had brought about: the Swedish imperial era had ended; Sweden entered the Age of Liberty, while Russia had emerged as a new empire.

Legacy
In pre-1917 Saint Petersburg, in the Vyborgsky district (relatively nearest to Russo-Finnish border) one of the thoroughfares (now Lesnoy prospekt) was named after the Nystad treaty (Nystadt Street, Rus. Ништадтская улица). The district also houses a church commemorating the first Russian victory in the Great Northern war, the Battle of Poltava – St. Sampsonius' Cathedral.

See also
List of treaties

References

External links

 Freden i Nystad – Ништадтский мир 1721 – Uudenkaupungin rauha 1721. Trilingual source publication (Finnish, Swedish, Russian) of the documents concerning the peace treaty from The Russian Foreign Ministry Archives. Published by Agricola – The Finnish History Network publication series number 10. 2014 (Heidi Pitkänen red.) 

 International conference ‘The Border of the Treaty of Nystad – Peter the Great’s Line’ dedicated to the Tercentenary of the Great Northern War’s end and the making of the Treaty of Nystad. Vyborg, Leningrad Region. October 7-8, 2021 The Conference is dedicated to the Tercentenary of the Great Northern War’s, making of the Treaty of Nystad and demarcation of the border between Russia and Sweden in 1722. The aim of the conference is to thoroughly study the history of the border demarcation between Russia and Sweden, its influence on the historical and cultural heritage in the borderline territories, to draw attention to the problems of preservation of monuments dated back to the Peter the Great’s period as well to expand co-operation between Russian and European researchers in studying Peter I’s period.

Vyborg, Leningrad Region. October 7-8, 2021

Nystad
18th century in Estonia
Ingria
Swedish Livonia
Nystad
Nystad
History of the Karelian Isthmus
1721 in Finland
1721 in Russia
1721 in Sweden
Uusikaupunki
Treaties involving territorial changes
1721 treaties
Treaties of the Russian Empire
Russia–Sweden treaties